The Columbus Foundation is a nonprofit charitable organization in Columbus, Ohio, founded in 1943.

History
The foundation was created by Harrison M. Sayre. Sayre's father was involved in philanthropy in Newark, Ohio. As Sayre became more involved in the community, he felt he could benefit it with the community foundation. Sayre and Russell Cole met with Huntington Bank and City National Bank executives to establish the foundation on December 29, 1943. In 1947, the Ohio National Bank joined the foundation. At Sayre's death, the organization received about 150 donations in his honor.

Location
The Columbus Foundation is housed in the Old Governor's Mansion at 1234 E. Broad St., built in 1904. Also known as the Ohio Archives Building or as the Charles H. Lindenberg Home, the building was listed on the National Register of Historic Places in 1972, and is also part of the register's East Broad Street Historic District. It was designed in Colonial Revival and/or Neo-Georgian eclectic style by architect Frank Packard. The listing is for six acres including three contributing buildings. It was built for Charles H. Lindenberg, president of the Lilley Regalia Company. It was later home of ten governors of Ohio and their families, during a 36-year period.

In 2008, the foundation demolished the Joseph F. Firestone House, neighboring the organization's headquarters and built c. 1900. The house had been vacant for years, and the foundation considered saving it, but the structure was deemed too impractical and expensive to be converted for further use. The building was a part of the East Broad Street Historic District on the National Register of Historic Places. It was replaced with a surface parking lot and green space.

See also
 National Register of Historic Places listings in Columbus, Ohio

References

External links

 

Houses on the National Register of Historic Places in Ohio
National Register of Historic Places in Columbus, Ohio
Colonial Revival architecture in Ohio
Houses completed in 1904
Houses in Columbus, Ohio
Frank Packard buildings
Organizations based in Columbus, Ohio
Foundations based in the United States
Charities based in Ohio
King-Lincoln Bronzeville
Individually listed contributing properties to historic districts on the National Register in Ohio
Broad Street (Columbus, Ohio)
Historic district contributing properties in Columbus, Ohio